Sephardi Hebrew (or Sepharadi Hebrew;) is the pronunciation system for Biblical Hebrew favored for liturgical use by Sephardi Jewish practice.  Its phonology was influenced by contact languages such as Spanish, Judaeo-Spanish (Ladino), Arabic, Portuguese and Modern Greek.

Phonology 
There is some variation between the various forms of Sephardi Hebrew, but the following generalisations may be made:
The stress tends to fall on the last syllable wherever that is the case in Biblical Hebrew.
The letter ע (`ayin) is realized as a sound, but the specific sound varies between communities. One pronunciation associated with the Hebrew of Western Sephardim (Spanish and Portuguese Jews of Northern Europe and their descendants) is a velar nasal sound, as in English singing, but other Sephardim of the Balkans, Anatolia, North Africa, and the Levant maintain the pharyngeal sound of Yemenite Hebrew or Arabic of their regional coreligionists. 
/r/ is invariably alveolar trill or tap (like Spanish r), rather than uvular (the r common to several German and Yiddish dialects, or better known as the French r).
/t/ and /d/ are more often realized as dental plosives, rather than alveolar.
The Sephardi dialects observe the Kimhian five-vowel system (a e i o u), either with or without distinctions of vowel length:
Tsere is pronounced , not  as may be found in Ashkenazi Hebrew
Kamats gadol is pronounced , not  as in Ashkenazi, Yemenite, or Tiberian Hebrew

This last difference is the standard shibboleth for distinguishing Sephardi from Ashkenazi, Yemenite, and Tiberian Hebrew. The differentiation between kamatz gadol and kamatz katan is made according to purely phonetic rules, without regard to etymology, which occasionally leads to spelling pronunciations at variance with the rules laid down in Biblical Hebrew grammar books. For example, כָל (all), when unhyphenated, is pronounced "kal", rather than "kol" (in "kal 'atsmotai" and "Kal Nidre"), and צָהֳרַיִם  (noon) is pronounced "tsahorayim", rather than "tsohorayim". This feature is also found in Mizrahi Hebrew, but is not found in Israeli Hebrew. It is represented in the transliteration of proper names in the Authorised Version, such as "Naomi", "Aholah" and "Aholibamah".

Letter pronunciation
Consonants

Vowels

Variants

Sephardim differ on the pronunciation of bet raphe (bet without dagesh).

That may reflect changes in the pronunciation of Spanish.  In Medieval Spanish (and in Judaeo-Spanish), b and v were separate, with b representing a voiced bilabial stop and v realized as a bilabial fricative [β]. However, in Renaissance and modern Spanish, both are pronounced  (bilabial v) after a vowel (or continuant) and  otherwise (such as after a pause).

There is also a difference in the pronunciation of tau raphe (tau without dagesh):
The normal Sephardi pronunciation (reflected in Israeli Hebrew) is as an unvoiced dental plosive;
Greek Sephardim (like some Mizrahi Jews, such as Iraqis and Yemenites) pronounced it as a voiceless dental fricative;
Some Spanish and Portuguese Jews and Sephardim from the Spanish-Moroccan tradition pronounce it as a voiced dental plosive  or fricative  (see lenition).

Closely related to the Sephardi pronunciation is the Italian pronunciation of Hebrew, which may be regarded as a variant.

In communities from Italy, Greece and Turkey, he is not realized as  but as a silent letter because of the influence of Italian, Judaeo-Spanish and (to a lesser extent) Modern Greek, all of which lack the sound. That was also the case in early transliterations of Spanish-Portuguese manuscripts (Ashkibenu, as opposed to Hashkibenu), but he is now consistently pronounced in those communities. Basilectal Modern Hebrew also shares that characteristic, but it is considered substandard.

In addition to ethnic and geographical distinctions, there are some distinctions of register. Popular Sephardic pronunciation, such as for Spanish and Portuguese Jews, makes no distinction between pataḥ and qameṣ gadol [a], or between segol, ṣere and shewa na [e]: that is inherited from the old Palestinian vowel notation. In formal liturgical use, however, many Sephardim are careful to make some distinction between these vowels to reflect the Tiberian notation. (That can be compared to the attempts of some Ashkenazim to use the pharyngeal sounds of ḥet and ayin in formal contexts, such as reading the Torah.)

History
There have been several theories on the origins of the different Hebrew reading traditions. The basic cleavage is between those who believe that the differences arose in medieval Europe and those who believe that they reflect older differences between the pronunciations of Hebrew and Aramaic in different parts of the Fertile Crescent: Judaea, Galilee, Syria, northern Mesopotamia and Babylonia proper.

Within the first group of theories, Zimmels believed that the Ashkenazi pronunciation arose in late medieval Europe and that the pronunciation prevailing in France and Germany during the Tosafists was similar to the Sephardic. He noted that Asher ben Jehiel, a German who became chief rabbi of Toledo, never refers to any difference of pronunciation though he is normally very sensitive to differences between the two communities.

The difficulty with the second group of theories is that it is uncertain what the pronunciations of the countries actually were and how far they differed. Since the expulsion of the Jews from Spain in 1492, if not earlier, the Sephardic pronunciation of the vowels became standard in all those countries, ironing out any differences that previously existed.  That makes it harder to adjudicate between the different theories on the relationship between today's pronunciation systems and those of ancient times.

Leopold Zunz believed that the Ashkenazi pronunciation was derived from that of Palestine in Geonic times (7th-11th centuries) and that the Sephardi pronunciation was derived from that of Babylonia. The theory was supported by the fact that in some respects, Ashkenazi Hebrew resembles the western dialect of Syriac, and Sephardi Hebrew resembles the eastern dialect: Eastern Syriac Peshitta as against Western Syriac Peshito. Ashkenazi Hebrew, in its written form, also resembles Palestinian Hebrew in its tendency to malē spellings (see Mater lectionis).

Others, including Abraham Zevi Idelsohn, believed that the distinction is more ancient and represents the distinction between the Judaean and Galilean dialects of Hebrew in Mishnaic times (1st-2nd centuries), with the Sephardi pronunciation being derived from Judaean and the Ashkenazi from Galilean. The theory is supported by the fact that Ashkenazi Hebrew, like Samaritan Hebrew, has lost the distinct sounds of many of the guttural letters, and there are references in the Talmud to that as a feature of Galilean speech. The 14th century, German Jewish work, Sefer Asufot seems to suggest that medieval Ashkenazi Hebrew was much akin to medieval Sephardi Hebrew.

In the time of the Masoretes (8th-10th centuries), there were three distinct notations for denoting vowels and other details of pronunciation in biblical and liturgical texts. One was the Babylonian; another was the Palestinian; still another was the Tiberian, which eventually superseded the other two and is still in use today.

Of them, the Palestinian notation provides the best fit to the current Sephardi pronunciation; for example, it does not distinguish between pataẖ and qamats or between segol and tsere.  (Similarly, the Babylonian notation appears to fit the Yemenite pronunciation.) The Tiberian notation does not quite fit any pronunciation in use today, but the underlying pronunciation has been reconstructed by modern scholars: see Tiberian vocalization. (A variant of the Tiberian notation was used by Ashkenazim before it was superseded by the standard version.)

By the time of Saadia Gaon and Jacob Qirqisani, the "Palestinian" pronunciation had come to be regarded as standard, even in Babylonia (for references, see Mizrahi Hebrew). That development roughly coincided with the popularisation of the Tiberian notation.

The accepted rules of Hebrew grammar were laid down in medieval Spain by grammarians such as Judah ben David Hayyuj and Jonah ibn Janah and later restated in a modified form by the Kimhi family; the current Sephardic pronunciation largely reflects the system that it laid down. By then, the Tiberian notation was universally used though it was not always reflected in pronunciation. The Spanish grammarians accepted the rules laid down by the Tiberian Masoretes, with the following variations:
The traditional Sephardic pronunciation of the vowels (inherited, as it seems, from the old Palestinian system) was perpetuated. Their failure to fit the Tiberian notation was rationalised by the theory that the distinctions between Tiberian symbols represented differences of length rather than quality: pataẖ was short a, qamats was long a, segol was short e and tsere was long e.
The theory of long and short vowels was also used to adapt Hebrew to the rules of Arabic poetic meter. For example, in Arabic (and Persian) poetry, when a long vowel occurs in a closed syllable an extra (short) syllable is treated as present for metrical purposes but is not represented in pronunciation.  Similarly in Sephardic Hebrew a shewa after a syllable with a long vowel is invariably treated as vocal. (In Tiberian Hebrew, that is true only when the long vowel is marked with a meteg.)

There are further differences:
Resh is invariably pronounced by Sephardim as a "front" alveolar trill; in the Tiberian system, the pronunciation appears to have varied with the context and so it was treated as a letter with a double (sometimes triple) pronunciation.

In brief, Sephardi Hebrew appears to be a descendant of the Palestinian tradition, partially adapted to accommodate the Tiberian notation and further influenced by the pronunciation of Arabic, Spanish and Judaeo-Spanish (Ladino).

Influence on Israeli Hebrew 

When Eliezer ben Yehuda drafted his Standard Hebrew language, he based it on Sephardi Hebrew, both because this was the de facto spoken form as a lingua franca in the land of Israel and because he believed it to be the most beautiful of the Hebrew dialects.

Endnotes

References

 Almoli, Solomon, Halichot Sheva: Constantinople 1519
 Kahle, Paul, Masoreten des Ostens: Die Altesten Punktierten Handschriften des Alten Testaments und der Targume: 1913, repr. 1966
 Kahle, Paul, Masoreten des Westens: 1927, repr. 1967 and 2005
 S. Morag, 'Pronunciations of Hebrew', Encyclopaedia Judaica XIII, 1120–1145
 
 Zimmels, Ashkenazim and Sephardim: their Relations, Differences, and Problems As Reflected in the Rabbinical Responsa : London 1958 (since reprinted). 

Hebrew
Hebrew words and phrases
Sephardi Jews topics